Ansonia endauensis is a species of toads in the family Bufonidae. It is endemic to the Malay Peninsula and only known from the Endau-Rompin National Park in southern Peninsular Malaysia.

Description
The distinguishing features of the species include unique red eye color, dual vocal slits in males, and a unique combination of head, body, digit, and color pattern characteristics. The habitus is slender. The dorsum is almost uniformly black, with orange spots on the flanks, the sides of neck and head, as well as below the eye.

Habitat and conservation
The species inhabits closed-canopy lowland forest.

The known population lives within a well-protected reserve. Habitat loss caused by logging and agricultural expansion is a probably threat outside the reserve.

References

endauensis
Amphibians of Malaysia
Endemic fauna of Malaysia
Amphibians described in 2006
Taxa named by Larry Lee Grismer